Fighting Fire with Fire is the debut studio album by American country music artist Davis Daniel, released in 1991 via Mercury Records. Its title track was one of the album's four singles, along with "Picture Me", "For Crying Out Loud" and "Still Got a Crush on You". "For Crying Out Loud" was the highest-peaking of these three, reaching #13 on the Hot Country Songs charts in 1991.

Track listing

Personnel
Musicians
Bobby All - acoustic guitar
Eddie Bayers - drums
Mike Chapman - bass guitar
Eric Daniel - snuff can, shaker
Rick Durrett - synthesizer
Ronnie Godfrey - piano, synthesizer
Rob Hajacos - fiddle
Leo Jackson - acoustic guitar
Brent Mason - electric guitar
Barry Paul - acoustic guitar
Gary Prim - piano
Michael Rhodes - bass guitar
Tom Robb - bass guitar
Hargus "Pig" Robbins - piano
Brent Rowan - acoustic guitar, electric guitar
Larry Sasser - steel guitar
Michael Severs - acoustic guitar
Pat Severs - acoustic guitar
Milton Sledge - drums
Jeff Williams - hubcap, background vocals ("Across the Room to You" only)
Curtis Young - background vocals (all tracks)

Technical
 Bobby Bradley - engineering
 Ron Haffkine - production
 Denny "Cobra" Knight - recording, mixing
 Benny Quinn - mastering

Chart performance

References

1991 debut albums
Davis Daniel albums
Mercury Nashville albums
Albums produced by Ron Haffkine